Geometric Dimensioning and Tolerancing (GD&T) is a system for defining and communicating engineering tolerances and relationships. It uses a symbolic language on engineering drawings and computer-generated three-dimensional solid models that explicitly describe nominal geometry and its allowable variation. It tells the manufacturing staff and machines what degree of accuracy and precision is needed on each controlled feature of the part. GD&T is used to define the nominal (theoretically perfect) geometry of parts and assemblies, to define the allowable variation in form and possible size of individual features, and to define the allowable variation between features.

Dimensioning specifications define the nominal, as-modeled or as-intended geometry. One example is a basic dimension.
Tolerancing specifications define the allowable variation for the form and possibly the size of individual features, and the allowable variation in orientation and location between features. Two examples are linear dimensions and feature control frames using a datum reference (both shown below).

There are several standards available worldwide that describe the symbols and define the rules used in GD&T. One such standard is American Society of Mechanical Engineers (ASME)  Y14.5. This article is based on that standard. Other standards, such as those from the International Organization for Standardization (ISO) describe a different system which has very different interpretation rules (see GPS&V). The Y14.5 standard provides a fairly complete set of rules for GD&T in one document. The ISO standards, in comparison, typically only address a single topic at a time. There are separate standards that provide the details for each of the major symbols and topics below (e.g. position, flatness, profile, etc.). BS 8888 provides a self-contained document taking into account a lot of GPS&V standards.

Origin  
The origin of GD&T is credited to Stanley Parker, who developed the concept of "true position". While little is known about Parker's life, it is known that he worked at the Royal Torpedo Factory in Alexandria, West Dunbartonshire, Scotland. His work increased production of naval weapons by new contractors.

In 1940, Parker published Notes on Design and Inspection of Mass Production Engineering Work, the earliest work on geometric dimensioning and tolerancing. In 1956, Parker published Drawings and Dimensions, which became the basic reference in the field.

Dimensioning and tolerancing philosophy 
According to the ASME Y14.5-2009  standard, the purpose of GD&T is to describe the engineering intent of parts and assemblies. The datum reference frame can describe how the part fits or functions. GD&T can more accurately define the dimensional requirements for a part, allowing over 50% more tolerance zone than coordinate (or linear) dimensioning in some cases. Proper application of GD&T will ensure that the part defined on the drawing has the desired form, fit (within limits) and function with the largest possible tolerances. GD&T can add quality and reduce cost at the same time through producibility.

There are some fundamental rules that need to be applied (these can be found on page 7 of the 2009 edition of the standard):
 All dimensions must have a tolerance.  Every feature on every manufactured part is subject to variation, therefore, the limits of allowable variation must be specified. Plus and minus tolerances may be applied directly to dimensions or applied from a general tolerance block or general note.  For basic dimensions, geometric tolerances are indirectly applied in a related Feature Control Frame.  The only exceptions are for dimensions marked as minimum, maximum, stock or reference.
 Dimensions define the nominal geometry and allowable variation. Measurement and scaling of the drawing is not allowed except in certain cases.
 Engineering drawings define the requirements of finished (complete) parts. Every dimension and tolerance required to define the finished part shall be shown on the drawing. If additional dimensions would be helpful, but are not required, they may be marked as reference.
 Dimensions should be applied to features and arranged in such a way as to represent the function of the features. Additionally, dimensions should not be subject to more than one interpretation.
 Descriptions of manufacturing methods should be avoided. The geometry should be described without explicitly defining the method of manufacture.
 If certain sizes are required during manufacturing but are not required in the final geometry (due to shrinkage or other causes) they should be marked as non-mandatory.
 All dimension and tolerance should be arranged for maximum readability and should be applied to visible lines in true profiles.
 When geometry is normally controlled by gage sizes or by code (e.g. stock materials), the dimension(s) shall be included with the Gage or code number in parentheses following or below the dimension.
 Angles of 90° are assumed when lines (including center lines) are shown at right angles, but no angular dimension is explicitly shown.  (This also applies to other orthogonal angles of 0°, 180°, 270°, etc.)
 Unless explicitly stated, all dimensions and tolerances are only valid when the item is in a free state.
 Dimensions and tolerances apply to the length, width, and depth of a feature including form variation.
 Dimensions and tolerances only apply at the level of the drawing where they are specified. It is not mandatory that they apply at other drawing levels, unless the specifications are repeated on the higher level drawing(s).

(Note: The rules above are not the exact rules stated in the ASME Y14.5-2009 standard.)

Symbols 
Tolerances: Type of tolerances used with symbols in feature control frames can be 1) equal bilateral 2) unequal bilateral 3) unilateral 4) no particular distribution (a "floating" zone)

Tolerances for the profile symbols are equal bilateral unless otherwise specified, and for the position symbol tolerances are always equal bilateral. For example, the position of a hole has a tolerance of .020 inches. This means the hole can move ±.010 inches, which is an equal bilateral tolerance. It does not mean the hole can move +.015/−.005 inches, which is an unequal bilateral tolerance. Unequal bilateral and unilateral tolerances for profile are specified by adding further information to clearly show this is what is required.

Datums and datum references 

A datum is a virtual ideal plane, line, point, or axis. A datum feature is a physical feature of a part identified by a datum feature symbol and corresponding datum feature triangle, e.g.,

These are then referred to by one or more 'datum references' which indicate measurements that should be made with respect to the corresponding datum feature .

GD&T Certification
The American Society of Mechanical Engineers (ASME) provides two levels of certification:

Technologist GDTP, which provides an assessment of an individual’s ability to understand drawings that have been prepared using the language of Geometric Dimensioning & Tolerancing.
Senior GDTP, which provides the additional measure of an individual’s ability to select proper geometric controls as well as to properly apply them to drawings.

Data exchange
Exchange of geometric dimensioning and tolerancing (GD&T) information between CAD systems is available on different levels of fidelity for different purposes:
 In the early days of CAD, exchange-only lines, texts and symbols were written into the exchange file. A receiving system could display them on the screen or print them out, but only a human could interpret them.
 GD&T presentation: On a next higher level the presentation information is enhanced by grouping them together into callouts for a particular purpose, e.g. a datum feature callout and a datum reference frame.  And there is also the information which of the curves in the file are leader, projection or dimension curves and which are used to form the shape of a product.
 GD&T representation: Unlike GD&T presentation, the GD&T representation does not deal with how the information is presented to the user but only deals with which element of a shape of a product has which GD&T characteristic. A system supporting GD&T representation may display GD&T information in some tree and other dialogs and allow the user to directly select and highlight the corresponding feature on the shape of the product, 2D and 3D.
 Ideally both GD&T presentation and representation are available in the exchange file and are associated with each other.  Then a receiving system can allow a user to select a GD&T callout and get the corresponding feature highlighted on the shape of the product.
 An enhancement of GD&T representation is defining a formal language for GD&T (similar to a programming language) which also has built-in rules and restrictions for the proper GD&T usage. This is still a research area (see below reference to McCaleb and ISO 10303-1666).
 GD&T validation: Based on GD&T representation data (but not on GD&T presentation) and the shape of a product in some useful format (e.g. a boundary representation), it is possible to validate the completeness and consistency of the GD&T information. The software tool FBTol from the Kansas City Plant is probably the first one in this area.
 GD&T representation information can also be used for the software assisted manufacturing planning and cost calculation of parts. See ISO 10303-224 and 238 below.

Documents and standards

ISO TC 10 Technical product documentation 
 ISO 129 Technical drawings – Indication of dimensions and tolerances
 ISO 7083 Symbols for geometrical tolerancing – Proportions and dimensions
 ISO 13715 Technical drawings – Edges of undefined shape – Vocabulary and indications
 ISO 15786 Simplified representation and dimensioning of holes
 ISO 16792:2015 Technical product documentation—Digital product definition data practices (Note: ISO 16792:2006 was derived from ASME Y14.41-2003 by permission of ASME)

ISO/TC 213 Dimensional and geometrical product specifications and verification 
In ISO/TR 14638 GPS – Masterplan the distinction between fundamental, global, general and complementary GPS standards is made.

 Fundamental GPS standards
 ISO 8015 Concepts, principles and rules
 Global GPS standards
 ISO 14660-1 Geometrical features
 ISO/TS 17, orientation and location
 ISO 1101 Geometrical tolerancing – Tolerances of form, orientation, location and run-out
 Amendment 1 Representation of specifications in the form of a 3D model
 ISO 1119 Series of conical tapers and taper angles
 ISO 2692 Geometrical tolerancing – Maximum material requirement (MMR), least material requirement (LMR) and reciprocity requirement (RPR)
 ISO 3040 Dimensioning and tolerancing – Cones
 ISO 5458 Geometrical tolerancing – Positional tolerancing
 ISO 5459 Geometrical tolerancing – Datums and datum systems
 ISO 10578 Tolerancing of orientation and location – Projected tolerance zone
 ISO 10579 Dimensioning and tolerancing – Non-rigid parts
 ISO 14406 Extraction
 ISO 22432 Features used in specification and verification
 General GPS standards: Areal and profile surface texture
 ISO 1302 Indication of surface texture in technical product documentation
 ISO 3274 Surface texture: Profile method – Nominal characteristics of contact (stylus) instruments
 ISO 4287 Surface texture: Profile method – Terms, definitions and surface texture parameters
 ISO 4288 Surface texture: Profile method – Rules and procedures for the assessment of surface texture
 ISO 8785 Surface imperfections – Terms, definitions and parameters
 Form of a surface independent of a datum or datum system. Each of them has a part 1 for the Vocabulary and parameters and a part 2 for the Specification operators:
 ISO 12180 Cylindricity
 ISO 12181 Roundness
 ISO 12780 Straightness
 ISO 12781 Flatness
 ISO 25178 Surface texture: Areal
 General GPS standards: Extraction and filtration techniques
 ISO/TS 1661 Filtration
 ISO 11562 Surface texture: Profile method – Metrological characteristics of phase correct filters
 ISO 12085 Surface texture: Profile method – Motif parameters
 ISO 13565 Profile method; Surfaces having stratified functional properties

ASME standards 
 ASME Y14.41 Digital Product Definition Data Practices
 ASME Y14.5 Dimensioning and Tolerancing
 ASME Y14.5.1M Mathematical Definition of Dimensioning and Tolerancing Principles

ASME is also working on a Spanish translation for the ASME Y14.5 – Dimensioning and Tolerancing Standard.

GD&T standards for data exchange and integration 
 ISO 10303 Industrial automation systems and integration — Product data representation and exchange
 ISO 10303-47 Integrated generic resource: Shape variation tolerances
 ISO/TS 10303-1130 Application module: Derived shape element
 ISO/TS 10303-1050 Application module: Dimension tolerance
 ISO/TS 10303-1051 Application module: Geometric tolerance
 ISO/TS 10303-1052 Application module: Default tolerance
 ISO/TS 10303-1666 Application module: Extended geometric tolerance
 ISO 10303-203 Application protocol: Configuration controlled 3D design of mechanical parts and assemblies
 ISO 10303-210 Application protocol: Electronic assembly, interconnection, and packaging design
 ISO 10303-214 Application protocol: Core data for automotive mechanical design processes
 ISO 10303-224 Application protocol: Mechanical product definition for process planning using machining features
 ISO 10303-238 Application protocol: Application interpreted model for computerized numerical controllers (STEP-NC)
 ISO 10303-242 Application protocol: Managed model based 3D engineering

See also 
 Specification of surface finish
 Engineering fit
 Engineering tolerance

References

Further reading

External links 

 General tolerances for linear and angular dimensions according to ISO 2768
 What is GD&T
 The importance of GD&T
 GD&T Glossary of Terms and Definitions
 GDT: Introduction
 ASME Certification
 Changes and Additions to ASME Y14.5M
 NIST MBE PMI Validation and Conformance Testing Project Tests implementations of GD&T in CAD software
 STEP File Analyzer and Viewer - Analyze GD&T in a STEP file

Technical drawing
Applied geometry